Goode may refer to:

Businesses 
 Goode Brothers (disambiguation)
 GOODE Ski Technologies
 H. A. and W. Goode, regional department store in Australia

Places in the United States 
 Goode, Kansas, a ghost town
 Goode, Virginia, an unincorporated community 
 Goode Glacier, a glacier in the North Cascades National Park, Washington

Other uses 
 Goode (name)
 Goode Solar Telescope, a scientific facility
 Buddy Goode, a fictional character
 Harry H. Goode Memorial Award
 Thomas Goode Jones School of Law

See also 
 
 Good (disambiguation)
 Goodes (disambiguation)
 Goodness (disambiguation)
 Goods (disambiguation)